Below are the rosters for the 1993 UNCAF Nations Cup tournament in Tegucigalpa, Honduras, from March 5 to March 9, 1993.

Head coach: Juan José Gámez

Head coach: Jorge Marcelo Vieira
Raul Antonio Garcia GK 13/09/1962 CD Aguila El Salvador
Geovanny Trigueros Martinez DF 08/12/1966 CD Luis Angel Firpo El Salvador
Mario Ernesto Mayen DF 19/05/1968 Alianza FC El Salvador
Milton Antonio Melendez MF 08/03/1967 Alianza FC El Salvador
Jose Guillermo Rivera MF 25/11/1969 CD FAS El Salvador
Jorge Alberto Abrego DF 16/10/1964 CD FAS El Salvador
Raul Ignacio Diaz Arce FW 01/02/1970 CD Luis Angel Firpo El Salvador
Carlos Alfonso Castro MF 01/08/1967 Atletico Marte El Salvador
William Alexander Renderos FW 03/10/1971 CD FAS El Salvador
Fredy Orellana FW 10/05/1954 CD FAS El Salvador
Oscar Antonio Ulloa FW 16/09/1963 Alianza FC El Salvador
Carlos Eduardo Rivera GK 04/01/1959 CD Luis Angel Firpo El Salvador
Leonel Carcamo Batres DF 05/05/1965 CD Luis Angel Firpo El Salvador
Julio Amilcar Palacios FW 09/08/1961 Alianza FC El Salvador
Wiliam Adalberto Osorio DF 13/04/1971 CD FAS El Salvador

Head coach: Estanislao Malinowski

Head coach: Gustavo Daniel De Simone
Ricardo James GK 07/05/1966 CD Platense Honduras
Rogelio Clarke DF 09/02/1964 Arabe Unido Panama
Jose Alfredo Poyatos DF 27/11/1964 Tauro FC Panama
Fernando Bolivar DF 17/02/1967 Panama
Noel Gutierrez DF 07/04/1967 San Francisco Panama
Jorge Mendez DF 05/03/1959 Plaza Amador Panama
Franklin Delgado DF 18/02/1966 CD Tiburones El Salvador
Frank Lozada MF 06/10/1965 Perez Zeledon Costa Rica
Neftali Diaz MF 15/12/1971 Euro Kickers Panama
Rolando Botello MF 21/12/1968 Euro Kickers Panama
Erik Medina Bernal MF //19 Arabe Unido Panama
Jesus Julio MF 02/12/1962 Panama
Erick Ortega FW 27/02/1968 Fuerte San Francisco El Salvador
Jose Ariza FW 16/01/1966 Plaza Amador Panama
Julio Cesar Dely Valdes FW 12/03/1967 Nacional Montevideo Uruguay
Joseph Cox FW 10/12/1966 Plaza Amador Panama
Rene Victor Mendieta FW 16/06/1961 Leones Negros Universidad de Guadalajara Mexico
Jorge Luis Dely Valdes FW 12/03/1967 Consadole Sapporo Japon
Percival Antonio Piggott FW 23/11/1966 Tauro FC Panama
Agustin Castillo DF / /19 Panama
Ruben Elias Guevara MF 27/01/1964 Leon de Huanuco Peru

References

RSSSF Archive

1993 UNCAF Nations Cup
Copa Centroamericana squads
uncaF